Eremophila humilis is a flowering plant in the figwort family, Scrophulariaceae and is endemic to Western Australia. It is a low, rounded shrub with club-shaped leaves and white bell-shaped flowers and which is only found in a restricted area near Meekatharra.

Description

The outside of the tube and petal lobes are slightly hairy but the inside is glabrous. The 4 stamens extend beyond the end of the petal tube.

Taxonomy and naming 
The species was first formally described by Robert Chinnock in 2007 and the description was published in Eremophila and Allied Genera: A Monograph of the Plant Family Myoporaceae. The specific epithet (humilis) is a Latin word meaning "low" or "small" (usually in stature) referring to the habit of this species.

Distribution and habitat
Eremophila humilis grows in clay loam on stony hills near Mount Vernon, north west of Meekatharra in the Gascoyne biogeographic region.

Conservation status
Eremophila humilis is classified as "Priority One" by the Government of Western Australia Department of Parks and Wildlife, meaning that it is known from only one or a few locations which are potentially at risk.

References

humilis
Eudicots of Western Australia
Plants described in 2007
Taxa named by Robert Chinnock